BNP may refer to:

Politics
Bahujana Nidahas Peramuna, a Sri Lankan political party
 Balochistan National Party (Awami), a political party in Balochistan, Pakistan
 Balochistan National Party (Mengal), a political party in Balochistan, Pakistan
Bangladesh Nationalist Party, a Bangladeshi political party
Barbados National Party, a political party in Barbados
Basotho National Party, a political party in Lesotho
Belarusian Independence Party (Biełaruskaja Niezaležnickaja Partyja), during World War II
Bharatiya Navshakti Party (Indian New Force Party), an Indian political party
British National Party (disambiguation), political parties of the same name at different times

Places
Bannu Airport, Pakistan, IATA code
Barnstaple railway station, England, station code

Other uses
Brain natriuretic peptide, a hormone secreted in response to heart abnormalities 
Brand New Planet, a Canadian newspaper for children
Banque Nationale de Paris, now known as BNP Paribas, French international banking group
National Library of Peru (Spanish: Biblioteca Nacional del Perú)

See also
Barisan Nasional Pembebasan Patani (BNPP), an insurgent group in Southern Thailand